Jimmy Lahoud (born June 1949) is a Lebanese businessman and restaurateur in London, England. He has owned restaurants such as Quo Vadis, L'Escargot, and Café St. Pierre (which became Maison Novelli).  Lahoud is an art collector, displaying his Picasso, Miró, Chagall, Warhol and Matisse pieces in at least one of his restaurants. Lahoud is credited for launching the career of celebrity chef Marco Pierre White. With White, Lahoud established White Star Line Ltd, which owned the Belvedere Restaurant.

References

Lebanese businesspeople
British restaurateurs
Lebanese emigrants to the United Kingdom
Living people
1949 births